The 2015  Japan Sevens was held on 4–5 April 2015. It was the fourth edition of the tournament and the seventh instalment of the 2014–15 Sevens World Series.

Format
The teams were drawn into four pools of four teams each. Each team played everyone in their pool one time. The top two teams from each pool advanced to the Cup/Plate brackets. The bottom two teams from each group went to the Bowl/Shield brackets.

Teams
The 16 participating teams are:

Pool Stage
The draw was made on 29 March 2015.

Pool A

Pool B

Pool C

Pool D

Knockout stage

Shield

Bowl

Plate

Cup

Player scoring

Source: World Rugby

References

External links

Japan Sevens
2014–15 in Japanese rugby union
Japan Sevens